Mandhata Assembly constituency is one of the 230 Vidhan Sabha (Legislative Assembly) constituencies of Madhya Pradesh state in central India. It is part of Khandwa District.

List of MLAs
Narayan Patel (2020-2023) BJP (by election)
Narayan Patel (2018-2020) INC
Lokendra Singh Tomar BJP (2008-2013 व 2013-2018)
Thakur Rajnarayan Singh Purni (1998-2008) INC
Raghurajsingh Tomar (1990-1993 व 1993-1998) BJP
Thakur Rajnarayan Singh Purni (1985-1990) INC
Raghurajsingh Tomar (1977-1980, 1980-1985) BJP
Raghunath Mandloi (1972-1977) BJP
Radhakishan Bhagat (1967-1972) (Nirdali)

Election results

2018

2013

See also
Mandhata
 Mundi

References

Assembly constituencies of Madhya Pradesh